FIFA 2001 (known as FIFA 2001: Major League Soccer in North America and FIFA 2001: World Championship in Japan) is a football simulation video game and the sequel to FIFA 2000. It was succeeded by FIFA Football 2002. It features Paul Scholes on the UK cover and Ben Olsen on the North American cover. The game's Spanish cover features Gaizka Mendieta on it. It was released on 30 October 2000 for Microsoft Windows, 8 November 2000 for PlayStation, and 24 November 2000 for PlayStation 2 (a launch title in Europe). A Game Boy Color version was planned but cancelled. The game was given positive reviews.

Reception 

The game received positive reviews, GameRankings holds an score of 85.50% for PlayStation, 84.60% for PC, and 82.57% for PlayStation 2, Metacritic utilizes an 85 for the PlayStation & PC, and an 83 for the PlayStation 2. IGN gave FIFA 2001 a 9.2/10 for PlayStation, 9/10 for PS2, and 8.8/10 for PC. GameSpot gave it a 9/10, but PlayStation 8.3/10. FIFA 2001s PlayStation 2 version was a runner-up for GameSpots annual "Best Sports Game (Traditional)" prize among console games, which went to NFL 2K1.

The PlayStation version received "Gold" by from the Entertainment and Leisure Software Publishers Association (ELSPA), with at least 200,000 copies in the United Kingdom.

External links

References 

PlayStation (console) games
PlayStation 2 games
Windows games
Cancelled Game Boy Color games
EA Sports games
Electronic Arts games
2001
2000 video games
Video games developed in Canada
D.I.C.E. Award for Sports Game of the Year winners